Nigilgia eucallynta is a moth in the family Brachodidae. It was described by Edward Meyrick in 1937. It is found in Namibia and South Africa.

References

Brachodidae
Moths described in 1937